Chhaya is a city and a municipality in Porbandar district and Porbandar Taluka in the state of Gujarat, India.

Geography
Chhaya is situated on the west bank of the Porbandar creek and the Mokal Ran lies to the west of it.

Demographics
 India census, Chhaya had a population of 38,525. Males constitute 53% of the population and females 47%. Chhaya has an average literacy rate of 71%, higher than the national average of 59.5%; with male literacy of 78% and female literacy of 62%. 12% of the population is under 6 years of age. According to the 1881 census it had 996 inhabitants.

History
It was the Jethva capital after the abandonment of Ranpur and previous to the adoption of Porbandar, and the old palace is still there.

Jethwas are from Chhaya village. The Jethwas have had capitals at starting with Morvi in 900 AD, changing with times to Shrinagar, Dhank, Chhaya, Ghumli, Ranpur and lastly to Porbandar (from 1685 till 1947).

Suburb of Porbandar
Now Chhaya is the suburb of Porbandar city with modern facilities.

Main-attraction
Darbargarh, the palace of Jethwas at Chhaya was built around 1600.

The traditional Garba is organized here from monarchy period in Darbargadh area. Only traditional musical instruments and lyrics are used, no DJ.

References

 This article incorporates text from a publication now in the public domain: 

Cities and towns in Porbandar district